is the name of a neighborhood in Sumida, Tokyo, and a former ward (本所区 Honjo-ku) in the now-defunct Tokyo City. In 1947, when the 35 wards of Tokyo were reorganized into 23, it was merged with the suburban Mukojima ward to form the modern Sumida ward.

Neighborhoods
The former Honjo ward contained the following modern districts:
 Azumabashi
 Chitose
 Higashikomagata
 Honjo
 Ishiwara
 Kamezawa
 Kikukawa
 Kinshi
 Kotobashi
 Midori
 Mukojima
 Narihira
 Ryōgoku (sumo district)
 Taihei
 Tatekawa
 Yokoami
 Yokokawa

Places named after Honjo
 Honjo High School
 Honjo-Azumabashi Station
 Honjo Matsuzaka-cho Park

Neighborhoods of Tokyo